Roy Dadaynga Marika  (1925 – 1993) was an Aboriginal Australian artist and Indigenous rights activist. He was a member of the Marika family, brother of Mawalan 1 Marika, Mathaman Marika, Milirrpum Marika and Dhunggala Marika. 

He was the leader of the Rirratjingu clan of the Yolngu people from 1970 onwards, and the president of the Yirrkala Village Council on the Gove Peninsula in Arnhem Land, Northern Territory. The Marikas were involved in Milirrpum v Nabalco Pty Ltd (named after Roy's older brother Milirrpum, also known as the Gove land rights case). All five were politically active for the rights of the Indigenous Australians, and four of them were well-known Aboriginal artists. Roy and his four brothers led the other clans in presenting the Yirrkala bark petitions to the Australian Government, in the lead-up to the Gove land rights case.

He acted in two films: Werner Herzog's Where the Green Ants Dream (1984), and Banduk (1985).

Roy's daughter was Raymattja Marika  and his son is Banula Marika.

See also
People with the surname Marika

References

1920s births
1993 deaths
Australian indigenous rights activists
Australian Aboriginal artists
20th-century Australian artists
Artists from the Northern Territory
Place of birth missing
Australian painters
Australian Members of the Order of the British Empire